Cornelius Cole (1822–1924) was a U.S. Senator from California from 1867 to 1873. Senator Cole may also refer to:

Albert M. Cole (1901–1994), Kansas State Senate
Albert Cole (Massachusetts politician) (1904–1966), Massachusetts State Senate
Bill Cole (West Virginia politician) (born 1956), West Virginia State Senate
Dan H. Cole (1811–1881), New York State Senate
Ernest E. Cole (1871–1949), New York State Senate
Gordon E. Cole (1833–1890), Minnesota State Senate
Harry A. Cole (1921–1999), Maryland State Senate
Helen Cole (1922–2004), Oklahoma State Senate
Samuel Cole (politician) (1856–1935), Massachusetts State Senate
Tom Cole (born 1949), Oklahoma State Senate